Ropicella antennalis is a species of beetle in the family Cerambycidae, and the only species in the genus Ropicella. It was described by Breuning in 1940.

References

Apomecynini
Beetles described in 1940
Monotypic beetle genera